John Davidson (born 1944) is an English writer on mysticism and Christian origins.

References

External links
homepage

1944 births
Living people
Date of birth missing (living people)